Stollmann is a surname, likely of German origin. Notable people with the surname include:
 Jörg Stollmann, German architect
 Jost Stollmann (born 1955), German-Australian businessman

See also
 Stollman